The Eklund Hotel, also known as Hotel Eklund and located at 15 Main St. in Clayton, New Mexico, was built in 1892.  It is an example of Early Commercial architecture.  It was listed on the National Register of Historic Places in 2002.

It is located across the street from the historic Luna Theater, also NRHP-listed.

See also

National Register of Historic Places listings in Union County, New Mexico

References

External links
Hotel Eklund, official website

Hotel buildings on the National Register of Historic Places in New Mexico
Buildings designated early commercial in the National Register of Historic Places
Hotel buildings completed in 1892
Buildings and structures in Union County, New Mexico
National Register of Historic Places in Union County, New Mexico